Quiver is a first-person shooter developed by ADvertainment Software and published by ESD games in 1997. It was written for MS-DOS compatible operating systems and runs in up to 800×600 resolution. Quiver was primarily designed and created by Mike Taylor with music composed by David B. Schultz (also composed for Nitemare 3D). The game is similar to Doom, But with aliens.

Gameplay
The game is divided into three episodes consisting of about 8 normal levels and one boss level each. The story is simple: aliens have stolen some orbs that allow them to transport to the past, and your mission is to infiltrate their bases and recover the orbs.

The levels are a mix of industrial and medieval design, each level has three orbs in total, after you get the orbs the blue exit panel on the floor will become active.

After all three episodes are complete the game will tell you of an upcoming sequel.

Upon exiting the full version of the game, a cheat menu will show in the dos screen.

External links

 A review posted on usenet

1997 video games
DOS games
DOS-only games
First-person shooters
Video games with 2.5D graphics
Video games developed in the United States
Sprite-based first-person shooters